Sajjad Hussein Abed (born 9 September 1998) is an Iraqi footballer who plays as an attacker for Amanat Baghdad in Iraq Premier League.

International career
On 13 November 2017, Hussein made his first international cap with Iraq against Syria in a friendly match.

References

External links

1998 births
Living people
Iraqi footballers
Iraq international footballers
Association football forwards